Pavol Steiner, also Pavel Steiner and Paul Steiner (29 March 1908 in Bratislava – 4 June 1969 in Martin, Žilina) was a Czechoslovak Olympic water polo player and swimmer. He was also a cardiology surgeon. Steiner competed in the 1928 Summer Olympics in water polo, won a bronze medal at the 1931 European Aquatics Championships in swimming, and won five swimming gold medals and one water polo gold medal combined at the 1932 Maccabiah Games and 1935 Maccabiah Games in Mandatory Palestine.

Water polo and swimming career

Steiner was Jewish, and was a member of Jewish sport clubs in interwar Czechoslovakia.

He competed at 19 years of age with the Czechoslovakia men's national water polo team in the 1927 European Water Polo Championship in Bologna, Italy, in which they came in 7th.

Steiner competed in the 1928 Summer Olympics in Amsterdam, the Netherlands, coming in 9th with the Czechoslovakia men's national water polo team in  water polo at the Games. 

He also competed in swimming, and won a bronze medal at the 1931 European Aquatics Championships in Paris in the 100 m freestyle with the Czechoslovakia men's national swimming team. 

Steiner competed in swimming at the 1932 Maccabiah Games in Mandatory Palestine, the first Maccabiah Games, and won three gold medals. He won the 100m freestyle (breaking the record from Czechoslovakia), the 3x100m medley relay, and the 4x200m medley relay.

He competed at the 1935 Maccabiah Games. There, Steiner won two gold medals in swimming, in the 100m freestyle and in the 4x200m freestyle relay. He also won a team gold medal in water polo, as Czechoslovakia came out ahead of Austria and Palestine.

Cardiology surgeon
Steiner was a cardiology surgeon at Martin University Hospital in Martin, and performed there the first open cardiac surgery in Slovakia.

References

External links
"Pavol Steiner," sports-reference.

1908 births
1969 deaths
Cardiac surgeons
Competitors at the 1932 Maccabiah Games
Competitors at the 1935 Maccabiah Games
Czechoslovak Jews
Czechoslovak male swimmers
Czechoslovak male water polo players
Jewish swimmers
Jewish water polo players
Maccabiah Games gold medalists
Maccabiah Games competitors by country
Maccabiah Games medalists in swimming
Olympic water polo players of Czechoslovakia
Water polo players at the 1928 Summer Olympics
Sportspeople from Bratislava